James Oscar Smith (December 8, 1925 – February 8, 2005) was an American jazz musician whose albums often appeared on Billboard magazine charts. He helped popularize the Hammond B-3 organ, creating a link between jazz and 1960s soul music.

In 2005, Smith was awarded the NEA Jazz Masters Award from the National Endowment for the Arts, the highest honor that America bestows upon jazz musicians.

Early years
There is confusion about Smith's birth year, with sources citing either 1925 or 1928. Born James Oscar Smith in Norristown, Pennsylvania, he joined his father doing a song-and-dance routine in clubs at the age of six. He began teaching himself to play the piano. When he was nine, Smith won a Philadelphia radio talent contest as a boogie-woogie pianist. After a period in the U.S. Navy, he began furthering his musical education in 1948, with a year at Royal Hamilton College of Music, then the Leo Ornstein School of Music in Philadelphia in 1949. He began exploring the Hammond organ in 1951. From 1951 to 1954, he played piano, then organ in Philly R&B bands like Don Gardner and the Sonotones. He switched to organ permanently in 1954 after hearing Wild Bill Davis.

Career
He purchased his first Hammond organ, rented a warehouse to practice in and emerged after little more than a year. Upon hearing him playing in a Philadelphia club, Blue Note's Alfred Lion immediately signed him to the label and his second album, The Champ, quickly established Smith as a new star on the jazz scene. He was a prolific recording artist and, as a leader, dubbed The Incredible Jimmy Smith, he recorded around forty sessions for Blue Note in just eight years beginning in 1956. Albums from this period include The Sermon!, House Party, Home Cooking', Midnight Special, Back at the Chicken Shack and Prayer Meetin'.

Smith signed to the Verve label in 1962. His first album, Bashin', sold well and for the first time Smith worked with a big band, led by Oliver Nelson. Further big band collaborations followed with composer/arranger Lalo Schifrin for The Cat and guitarist Wes Montgomery, with whom he recorded two albums: The Dynamic Duo and Further Adventures of Jimmy and Wes. Other albums from this period include Blue Bash! and Organ Grinder Swing with Kenny Burrell, The Boss with George Benson, Who's Afraid of Virginia Woolf?, Got My Mojo Working, and Hoochie Coochie Man.

During the 1950s and 1960s, Smith almost always performed live, in a trio, consisting of organ, guitar and drums. The Jimmy Smith Trio performed "When Johnny Comes Marching Home" and "The Sermon" in the film Get Yourself a College Girl (1964).

In the 1970s, Smith opened his own supper club in the North Hollywood neighborhood of Los Angeles, California, at 12910 Victory Boulevard and played there regularly with Kenny Dixon on drums, Herman Riley and John F. Phillips on saxophone; also included in the band was harmonica/flute player Stanley Behrens. The 1972 album Root Down, considered a seminal influence on later generations of funk and hip-hop musicians, was recorded live at the club, albeit with a different group of backing musicians.

Later career
Holle Thee Maxwell, then known as Holly Maxwell, was Smith's vocalist for two years in the late 1970s. During a South African tour, they recorded the album Jimmy Smith Plays for the People in 1978.

Smith had a career revival in the 1980s and 1990s, again recording for Blue Note and Verve, and for Elektra and Milestone. He also recorded with Quincy Jones, Frank Sinatra, Michael Jackson (he can be heard on the title track of the Bad album), Dee Dee Bridgewater, and Joey DeFrancesco. His last album, Dot Com Blues (Blue Thumb/Verve, 2000), was recorded with B. B. King, Dr. John, and Etta James.

Smith and his wife moved to Scottsdale, Arizona, in 2004. She died of cancer a few months later. Smith recorded Legacy with Joey DeFrancesco, and the two prepared to go on tour.  However, before the tour began, Smith died on February 8, 2005, at his Scottsdale home, where he was found by his manager, Robert Clayton. He died in his sleep of natural causes.

Musical style

While the electric organ had been used in jazz by Fats Waller, Count Basie, Wild Bill Davis and others, Smith's virtuoso improvisation technique on the Hammond helped to popularize the electric organ as a jazz and blues instrument. The B3 and companion Leslie speaker produce a distinctive sound, including percussive "clicks" with each key stroke. The drawbar setting most commonly associated with Smith is to pull out the first three drawbars on the "B" preset on the top manual of the organ, with added harmonic percussion on the 3rd harmonic. This tone has been emulated by many jazz organists since Smith. Smith's style on fast tempo pieces combined bluesy "licks" with bebop-based single note runs.  For ballads, he played walking bass lines on the bass pedals. For uptempo tunes, he would play the bass line on the lower manual and use the pedals for emphasis on the attack of certain notes, which helped to emulate the attack and sound of a string bass.

Smith influenced a constellation of jazz organists, including Jimmy McGriff, Brother Jack McDuff, Don Patterson, Richard "Groove" Holmes, Joey DeFrancesco, Tony Monaco and Larry Goldings, as well as rock keyboardists such as Jon Lord, Brian Auger and Keith Emerson. Emerson would later recount a story where Smith grabbed Emerson's "meat and two veg" as a humorous greeting. Later, Smith influenced bands such as Medeski, Martin & Wood and the Beastie Boys, who sampled the bassline from "Root Down (and Get It)" from Root Down—and saluted Smith in the lyrics—for their own hit "Root Down". Often called the father of acid jazz, Smith lived to see that movement come to reflect his organ style. In the 1990s, Smith went to Nashville, taking a break from his ongoing gigs at his Sacramento restaurant which he owned and, in Music City, Nashville, he produced, with the help of a webmaster, Dot Com Blues, his last Verve album. In 1999, Smith guested on two tracks of a live album, Incredible! (Smith's nickname during the 1960s) with his protégé, Joey DeFrancesco, a then 28-year-old organist. Smith and DeFrancesco's collaborative album Legacy was released in 2005 shortly after Smith's death.

Discography

As leader/co-leader 
 A New Sound... A New Star... Jimmy Smith at the Organ, Volume 1 (Blue Note, 1956)
 A New Sound A New Star: Jimmy Smith at the Organ Volume 2 (Blue Note, 1956) – aka The Champ
 The Incredible Jimmy Smith at the Organ Volume 3 (Blue Note, 1956)
 At Club Baby Grand, Volume One (Blue Note, 1956)
 At Club Baby Grand, Volume Two (Blue Note, 1956)
 A Date with Jimmy Smith Volume One (Blue Note, 1957)
 A Date with Jimmy Smith Volume Two (Blue Note, 1957)
 Jimmy Smith at the Organ, Volume 1 (Blue Note, 1957)
 Jimmy Smith at the Organ, Volume 2 (Blue Note, 1957)
 The Sounds of Jimmy Smith (Blue Note, 1957)
 Plays Pretty Just for You (Blue Note, 1957)
 Groovin' at Smalls' Paradise, Volume One (Blue Note, 1958) – rec. 1957
 Groovin' at Smalls' Paradise, Volume Two (Blue Note, 1958) – rec. 1957
 House Party (Blue Note, 1958) – rec. 1957-58
 The Sermon! (Blue Note, 1959) – rec. 1957-58
 Crazy! Baby (Blue Note, 1960)
 Home Cookin' (Blue Note, 1961) – rec. 1958-59
 Midnight Special (Blue Note, 1961) – rec. 1960
 Plays Fats Waller (Blue Note, 1962)
 Bashin': The Unpredictable Jimmy Smith (Verve, 1962)
 Back at the Chicken Shack (Blue Note, 1963) – rec. 1960
 Hobo Flats (Verve, 1963)
 Rockin' the Boat (Blue Note, 1963)
 Any Number Can Win (Verve, 1963)
 Blue Bash! with Kenny Burrell (Verve, 1963)
 Who's Afraid of Virginia Woolf? (Verve, 1964)
 The Cat (Verve, 1964)
 Christmas '64 (Verve, 1964)
 Prayer Meetin' (Blue Note, 1964) – rec. 1963
 Softly as a Summer Breeze (Blue Note, 1965) – rec. 1958
 Monster (Verve, 1965)
 Organ Grinder Swing (Verve, 1965)
 Got My Mojo Workin' (Verve, 1965)
 La Metamorphose Des Cloportes (Verve, 1965)
 Live at the Village Gate (Metro, 1965)
 Bucket! (Blue Note, 1966) – rec. 1963
 Swings Along with Stranger in Paradise (Pickwick, 1966) – early recordings
 Live in Concert (Metro, 1966)
 Peter & the Wolf (Verve, 1966)
 Hoochie Coochie Man (Verve, 1966)
 Jimmy & Wes: The Dynamic Duo with Wes Montgomery (Verve, 1966)
 I'm Movin' On (Blue Note, 1967) – rec. 1963
 In Hamburg – Live! (Metro, 1967)
 Respect (Verve, 1967)
 Open House (Blue Note, 1968) – rec. 1960
 Stay Loose (Verve, 1968)
 Plain Talk (Blue Note, 1968) – rec. 1960
 Livin' It Up! (Verve, 1968)
 The Boss (Verve, 1968) – live
 Further Adventures of Jimmy and Wes with Wes Montgomery (Verve, 1968) – rec. 1966
 The Fantastic Jimmy Smith (Upfront, 1969) – early recordings
 Groove Drops (Verve, 1970)
 The Other Side of Jimmy Smith (MGM, 1970)
 I'm Gon' Git Myself Together (MGM, 1971)
 In a Plain Brown Wrapper (Verve, 1971)
 Root Down (Verve, 1972) – live
 Bluesmith (Verve, 1972)
 Newport In New York '72 (The Jimmy Smith Jam, Vol. 5) (Cobblestone, 1972)
 Portuguese Soul (Verve, 1973)
 Black Smith (Pride/Atlantic, 1974)
 Live In Israel (Isradisc, 1974) – Israel only release
 Paid in Full (Mojo, 1974)
 Jimmy Smith '75 (Mojo, 1975)
 Sit on It! (Mercury, 1977)
 It's Necessary (Mercury, 1977) – live
 Unfinished Business (Mercury, 1978)
 Jimmy Smith Plays For The People (Polydor, 1978) – South Africa only release
 Confirmation (Blue Note, 1979)
 Cool Blues (Blue Note, 1980) – live rec. 1958
 The Cat Strikes Again (Wersi, 1980; Inner City, 1981)
 On the Sunny Side (Blue Note, 1981)
 Second Coming (Mojo, 1981)
 Off the Top (Elektra/Musician, 1982)
 Keep On Comin'  (Elektra/Musician, 1983) – live at Atlanta Free Jazz Festival, September 3, 1983
 Special Guests (Blue Note, 1984)
 Go for Whatcha Know (Blue Note, 1985)
 Jimmy Smith Trio + LD  with Lou Donaldson(Blue Note, 1985) – Japan only release; rec. 1957
 Prime Time (Milestone, 1989)
 Fourmost with Stanley Turrentine, Kenny Burrell, Grady Tate (Milestone, 1991) – live rec. 1990
 Sum Serious Blues (Milestone, 1993)
 The Master (Blue Note, 1994) – live
 The Master II (Blue Note, 1994) – live
 Damn! (Verve, 1995)
 Angel Eyes: Ballads & Slow Jams (Verve, 1996)
 All the Way Live with Eddie Harris (Milestone, 1996) – rec. 1981
 Cherokee (Blue Note, 1996)
 Lonesome Road (Blue Note, 1996)
 Standards (Blue Note, 1998)
 Six Views of the Blues (Blue Note, 1999)
 Dot Com Blues (Blue Thumb/Verve, 2000)
 Fourmost Return (Milestone, 2001) – live rec. 1990
 Black Cat (Castle Pie, 2001)
 Straight Life (Blue Note, 2007) – rec. 1961

As sideman 

With King Curtis
 Get Ready (Atco, 1970)
 Everybody's Talkin (Atco, 1972)

With Joey DeFrancesco
 Incredible! (Concord Jazz, 2000)
 Legacy (Concord Jazz, 2005)

With Quincy Jones
 Smackwater Jack (A&M, 1971)
 The Original Jam Sessions 1969 with Bill Cosby (Concord Jazz, 2004) – rec. 1969

With others
 Beastie Boys, Ill Communication (Capitol, 1994)
 George Benson, George Benson: Compact Jazz (Verve, 1987)
 Jean-Michel Bernard, Cash (Naive, 2008)
 Dee Dee Bridgewater, Love and Peace: A Tribute to Horace Silver (Verve, 1995) – rec. 1994
 Kenny Burrell, Ellington Is Forever (Fantasy, 1975)
 Cornell Dupree, Shadow Dancing (Versatile, 1978)
 Stu Gardner, The Italian Heist (Super Disco Edits, 2019)
 Jon Hendricks, Love (Muse, 1982)
 James Ingram, It's Your Night (Qwest/Warner Bros., 1983)
 Michael Jackson, Bad (Epic, 1987)
 Toshihiko Kankawa, Quarter Run (Paddlewheel, 1984)
 Robbie Krieger, Robbie Krieger & Friends (Blue Note, 1977)
 Yoshiaki Miyanoue with special guest Jimmy Smith, Touch of Love (Vap, 1981)
 Frank Sinatra, L.A. Is My Lady (Qwest/WB, 1984)
 Candi Staton, Stand Up and Be a Witness (Beracah, 1989)
 Stanley Turrentine, Straight Ahead (Blue Note, 1985) – rec. 1984
 Lenny White, Venusian Summer (Nemperor, 1975)
 V.A., Newport In New York '72 (The Jam Sessions, Vol. 4) (Cobblestone, 1972)
 V.A., One Night With Blue Note, Volume 3 (Blue Note, 1985)

References

External links
Jimmy Smith comprehensive discography
 Jimmy Smith discography at Jazzlists

American jazz organists
American male organists
American jazz keyboardists
African-American jazz musicians
Jazz-funk organists
Soul-jazz organists
Hard bop organists
1920s births
2005 deaths
Musicians from Philadelphia
Verve Records artists
Mercury Records artists
Milestone Records artists
Blue Note Records artists
Custom Records artists
20th-century American male musicians
Blue Thumb Records artists
20th-century American keyboardists
20th-century organists
Jazz musicians from Pennsylvania
American male jazz musicians
20th-century African-American musicians
21st-century African-American people